Tutye is a locality situated on the section of the Mallee Highway between Ouyen and the South Australian border in the Sunraysia region of Victoria, Australia. The place by road, is situated about 9 kilometres southeast from Boinka and 12 kilometres northwest from Cowangie.

A Post Office opened on 15 July 1912 when a regular mail service was provided by the opening of the railway line from Ouyen to Murrayville a month earlier. The office closed in 1980. A primary school, Tutye State School, was officially opened in 1920, although it had been in operation since 1914. It no longer exists.

The area of the locality contains the smaller area of Tyalla.

References

Towns in Victoria (Australia)
Mallee (Victoria)